Trigonopterus delapan is a species of flightless weevil in the genus Trigonopterus from Indonesia.

Etymology
The specific name is derived the Indonesian word for "eight".

Description
Individuals measure 2.04–2.08 mm in length.  Body shape is slightly ovate.  General coloration is black, with rust-colored tarsi and antennae.

Range

Phylogeny
T. delapan is part of the T. saltator species group.

References

delapan
Beetles described in 2014
Beetles of Asia
Insects of Indonesia